Turn One Racing (formerly Wyler Racing) was an American NASCAR motor racing team that competed in the NASCAR Camping World Truck Series. The team was owned by Ohio car dealer Jeff Wyler until 2009 when driver Stacy Compton bought the assets of Wyler Racing and moved the team's base to Mooresville, North Carolina.

Sprint Cup Series 
On October 6, 2006, Wyler Racing tested a Toyota Camry Car of Tomorrow at Talladega Superspeedway with Ricky Rudd as the driver. During the 2007 season, the team competed in their first NASCAR Nextel Cup race in the Crown Royal Presents The Jim Stewart 400 with Johnny Benson driving the number 46 Toyota Camry. In the race, the team recorded a finishing position of thirty-first.

After a five-year hiatus, the team planned to return to the series with an alliance with Richard Childress Racing. in 2012 by competing in eight to ten races, beginning at Phoenix International Raceway. Stacy Compton was entered to run the 2012 Food City 500 at Bristol Motor Speedway, but Reed Sorenson qualified the car. In the race, Sorenson finished 42nd. After two races with the team, Sorenson moved to FAS Lane Racing to drive the number 32 car.

Camping World Truck Series 

Purchasing equipment from the defunct Fiddleback Racing, the 60 team began running in 2005 at The Milwaukee Mile, when Chad Chaffin finished seventeenth. Chaffin ran ten races for the team that season, posting a top-ten at the Sylvania 200. At the end of the season, he was replaced by Sprague, who had three top-tens in five starts for the team. In 2006, Con-way became the team's new sponsor, and Sprague responded with two wins and a fifth-place finish in points. The following year, Sprague won the first race of the season at Daytona, but fell to ninth in the standings.

Sprague and Con-way left at the end of 2007 for Kevin Harvick Incorporated and Roush Fenway Racing respectively. The team was to merge with South Point Racing to form Wyler-Gaughan Racing in 2008, but the deal fell through. Richard Johns was to be the driver of the No. 60, bringing along sponsorship from havfun.com for both the 2008 and 2009 seasons, but the deal fell through. The team replaced Johns with Terry Cook, who was originally scheduled to drive a second truck, the No. 06. Cook had two top-fives and was running tenth in points when the team released Cook and replaced him with Sprague. For 2009, Compton drove the No. 60 mostly unsponsored  until Safe Auto Insurance Company signed a 2-year deal to sponsor the team. Near the end of 2009, Wyler was unsure if the team would be able to continue into 2010, and Compton purchased the No. 60 truck in late 2009 so that the team could continue running. The team ran as Wyler Racing for most of 2010 until Compton renamed the team Turn One Racing, LLC. India's Narain Karthikeyan shared the driver seat with Compton starting at Martinsville Speedway and selected events, with Compton serving as Karthikeyan's driving coach. The team added on the No. 64 Truck with Chase Mattioli driving at Pocono. With Safe Auto departing for ThorSport Racing and Karthikeyan returning to F1 to drive for Hispania Racing, Red Bull development driver Cole Whitt, who ran the No. 60 at Homestead-Miami Speedway, drove the No. 60 full-time for Rookie of the Year with Red Bull sponsorship. Justin Marks returned with GoPro sponsorship for the first 12 races, before being replaced by various drivers to fill out the rest of the year.

Turn One Racing announced in 2011 that they intended to field a truck for Johnny Benson in 2012, but the deal fell through due to sponsorship issues. Cole Whitt left the team to drive for JR Motorsports in the Nationwide Series. Turn One Racing announced that they would be running a partial Sprint Cup schedule. J. R. Fitzpatrick drove the No. 60 with sponsorship from Equipment Express for the first two races, but decided to race in the Canadian Tire Series for the remainder of 2012. He was replaced by Chad McCumbee and Grant Enfinger for the following three races in the hopes of securing more sponsorship. Crew chief Kevin Starland left to join RBR Motorsports. After Starland's departure, the Truck team went on hiatus for the rest of 2012. The team was revived in 2013 with the arrival of Dakoda Armstrong and Winfield. Later in the season, on August 5, Joe Shear Jr., son of former driver Joe Shear, joined the No. 60 team from ThorSport Racing. The team once again shut down for the 2014 season.

References

External links 

Wyler website

2005 establishments in North Carolina
Defunct NASCAR teams
American auto racing teams
Companies based in Ohio
Auto racing teams established in 2005
Auto racing teams disestablished in 2013